Mohammad ibn Masoud Ayyashi or Mohammad ibn Masoud Ayyashi Samarqandi (probably died on 932), known as Ayyashi, was an eminent Shia Islam scholar. He had many works in the field of exegesis of the Quran, Islamic jurisprudence, Arabic literature and hadith. His exegesis of the Quran, known as Tafsir Ayyashi, is his most famous book.

Birthplace and lineage
His full name was Mohammad ibn Masoud ibn Mohammad Ayyashi Salami Samarqandi or Mohammad ibn Masoud Ayyashi Iraqi Kufi and his kunya or teknonymy was Abu Nazr. From the date of his birth and the birthplace of him, has not been recorded in history and only he has been mentioned as Samarkandi, Iraqi and Kufi. However, there is a narration which tells he was from Tamimi tribe. The great Shiite and Sunni scholars, such as: Ibn al-Nadim, Shaykh Tusi, Najashi, Ibn Shahr Ashub, Allamah Al-Hilli, Ibn Davoud Hilli, Abdollah Mamaghani, Muhammad Ardabili, Abbas Qomi, Agha Bozorg Tehrani and Seyyed Hassan Sadr consider him from Samarkand in Transoxiana

The father of Mohammad ibn Masoud Ayyashi was from a wealthy and well-known family in Samarkand. All of his fund was three hundred thousand dinars of the common currency of that era. His son, Mohammad ibn Masoud Ayyashi, spent all of the fund in spreading Islam science and literature and promoting the culture of Ahl al-Bayt.

Mohammad ibn Masoud Ayyashi was proficient in fields such as Fiqh, Politeness, Tafsir and Hadith and was considered one of the leading contemporary Shiite scholars with Muhammad ibn Ya'qub al-Kulayni. Mohammad Ali Modarres Tabrizi said that Muhammad ibn Umar al-Kashshi, the author of famous rijali book Rijal al-Kashshi, was one of the Ayyashi 's disciples. Modarres Tabrizi has also said that Ayyashi in sciences such as medicine, astronomy and jurisprudence has more than 200 volumes of books. Tafsir Ayyashi is one of his most important books, which is based on the assertions and hadiths of the Twelve Shiite Imams.

Education and career
Ayashi was originally Sunni due to his birth in a predominantly Sunni area (which was around Samarkand and Bukhara), but after researching Shiite works, he converted to Shiism. He then traveled to Kufa, Baghdad and Qom to study Islamic sciences.

After studying in the theological seminary of Kufa, Baghdad and Qom, Ayyashi returned to Samarkand and taught and promoted religious and Shiite teachings at his house. It is said that his house, like a mosque, was full of Quran readers, hadith narrators, scholars, students and commentators. He held two sessions: a scientific meeting for the general public and another assembly for the students.

Bibliography
Two hundred and eight works in various scientific fields such as history, jurisprudence, literature, exegesis and astronomy have been mentioned for Ayyashi. Unfortunately, most of his works have been lost. The remaining book Tafsir Ayyashi includes only the first half of it up to Al-Kahf Sura, which was available in the cities of Mashhad, Zanjan, Tabriz and Kadhimiya. The masters of these versions have been removed for brevity. Therefore, only the first volume of his exegesis works remains. Muhammad Husayn Tabatabai has spoken about the possibility of a second volume of the Tafsir Ayyashi in the southern regions of Iran. Some of his other works are as follows:

 Mecca and the sanctuary in biography study
 Opponents in poetry
 Poetry book
 The prophets and the saints
 Biography of Abi Bakr
 Biography of Umar
 Biography of Uthman
 Biography of Muawiyah
 The Prayer
 The Ritual purity
 Brief of the Prayer
 The Funerals
 Brief of the Funerals
 The Rites
 The scientist and the learner
 The Invitations
 The Zakat
 The Drinks
 The limit of sacrificial charity

Ayyashi from the perspective of others

Demise
The exact date of death of Mohammad ibn Masoud Ayyashi, despite all the investigations that have been carried out, has not been determined yet, only Al-Zirikli, author of al-Aʻlām, has considered the death date of Ayyashi in 932 AD (320 AH), but it is not clear from what source. It is probable that his death occurred in the same years as the death of Muhammad ibn Ya'qub al-Kulayni (864-941), considering that Ayyashi was a contemporary of him.

See also
 Mohammad ibn Umar Kashshi
 Zakaria ibn Idris Ash'ari Qomi
 Zakaria ibn Adam Ash'ari Qomi
 Ahmad ibn Ishaq Ash'ari Qomi
 Seyyed Mohammad Hojjat Kooh Kamari

References

External links
 Mohammad ibn Masoud Ayyashi on WikiShia
 TAFSIR AL- AYYASHI AND RECOVERY OF THE CHAIN TRANSMITTERS OF TRADITIONS OF ASANID AL- AHADITH IN THE SHAWAHID AL- TANZIL
 History and Historiography: An Entry from Encyclopaedia of the World of Islam – Google Books
 Reviews of Isra'iliyyat in Interpreting the "Tafsir Ayyashi"
 History of the commentators of the Qur`an

932 deaths
Shia hadith scholars
Shia clerics